Michelle Skeries (born 2 April 1996) is a German sport shooter.

She participated at the 2018 ISSF World Shooting Championships, winning a medal.

References

External links

Living people
1996 births
German female sport shooters
ISSF pistol shooters
21st-century German women